Iztapa, or Puerto de Iztapa, is a municipality in the Escuintla department of Guatemala. It is located on the shores of the Pacific Ocean and surrounded by Michatoya and Maria Linda Rivers, and also by the Canal de Chiquimulilla. Its population is about 15,000 people.

Etymology
As of 1850, the British were referring to the Iztapa as Yetapa.

Archaeology
Fishtail points, the most common style of tool manufacturing in Mesoamerica, were discovered in Iztapa (c. 7700–7300 BCE). They are considered to be the remains of an archaic Iztapan culture.

1897 port construction

In 1897, president José María Reina Barrios attempted to build an interoceanic railroad to offer it to international investors during the Central America Expo of that year.  His ambitious plan included a terminal at Iztapa Port, which was being built to improve conditions at Puerto San José.  However, the international price collapse of both coffee and silver brought all work to standstill and the railroad could not be completed; instead of the economic boom that the president had hoped for, the Expo signifiedthe end of his regime.  He was eventually murdered on 8 February 1898 after he tried to extend his presidential term until 1902.

Pictures from La Ilustración Guatemalteca

Geographic location

Climate
Iztapa has a tropical savanna climate (Köppen: Aw).

Sports
Deportivo Iztapa football club play in the National League of Guatemalan football. Their home venue is the Estadio Municipal Morón.

Iztapa is considered to be one of the best places in the world to catch Sailfish.

References

Municipalities of the Escuintla Department